Bomberman Ultra is a downloadable video game for PlayStation Network that was released in 2009 as part of the Bomberman franchise.

The game gives players the ability to fully customize their own Bomberman. The full selection of outfits is immediately unlockable from the very start off the game, allowing for more than 150,000 unique combinations.

Reception

Bomberman Ultra received "generally favorable reviews" according to the review aggregator Metacritic. IGN said, "A good deal at ten bucks, this is a download Bomberman fans will want to make room for."

References

External links

2009 video games
Action video games
Ultra
Hudson Soft games
Multiplayer online games
PlayStation 3 games
PlayStation 3-only games
PlayStation Network games
Split-screen multiplayer games
Video games developed in Japan